Eugène Alcan (1811 – c. 1898) was a French Jewish litterateur, painter, and poet, who embraced Roman Catholic Christianity. He was born in Paris in 1811, and died about 1898. He was a brother of Alphonse Alkan, but the reason for the difference in the orthography of the family name has never been explained.

Alcan was the author of the following works: 
 La Légende des Âmes: Souvenirs de Quelques Conférences de Saint Vincent de Paul (1879)
 La Flore Printanière: Souvenirs du Berceau et de la Première Enfance (1882)
 La Flore du Calvaire: Traits Caractéristiques de Quelques Voies Douloureuses (1884)
 Les Cannibales et Leur Temps: Souvenir de la Campagne de l'Océanie sous le Commandant Marceau, Capitaine de Frégate (1887)
 Les Grands Dévouements et l'Impôt du Sang (1890)
 Récits Instructifs du Père Balthazar (1892)

References

1811 births
1890s deaths
19th-century French painters
French male painters
19th-century French poets
19th-century French Jews
French Roman Catholic writers
Converts to Roman Catholicism from Judaism
French male poets
19th-century French male writers
19th-century French male artists